This is the discography of Joe Satriani, an American multi-instrumentalist known primarily for his work as an instrumental rock guitarist, with multiple Grammy Award nominations. This discography includes all of his albums, including collaborations with Chickenfoot, Blue Öyster Cult, Stuart Hamm, Alice Cooper, and Spinal Tap, as well as early Squares material and G3 projects (see the collaborations section for more details).

Since his self-titled debut EP in 1984, Satriani has released five live albums, five compilations, four extended plays, and seventeen studio albums, three of which have received Gold certification in the United States, while Surfing with the Alien went Platinum.

Studio albums

Extended plays

Compilations

Live/video albums

Projects and collaborations

In 1986, Satriani teamed up with Crowded House to record their eponymous studio album, Crowded House. The same year, he also recorded Love and Rock and Roll  with The Greg Kihn Band. A year later, the guitarist played on Danny Gottlieb's Aquamarine. He also produced The Eyes of Horror by Possessed. In 1988, Satriani contributed to Radio Free Albemuth by Stuart Hamm and Imaginos by Blue Öyster Cult. For the last release, Satriani worked as the record's producer. In 1991, he played guitar parts on the Alice Cooper album Hey Stoopid. The next year, he worked with Brian May on Back to the Light as well as Break Like the Wind by Spinal Tap. In 1997, he worked with Pat Martino on the album All Sides Now and King Biscuit Flower Hour by the Greg Kihn Band.

Also in 1997, Satriani recorded the album Merry Axemas Volume 1 with Steve Vai, Alex Lifeson, and Joe Perry. In 2003, he worked on The Yardbirds album Birdland. A year later, he was a guest on Jordan Rudess' release, entitled Rhythm of Time. In 2006, the guitarist played on Gillan's Inn by Ian Gillan as well as Transformations Live for the People by Particle. The following year saw Satriani playing on The Devil Knows My Name by John 5 and Guitar Masters, Vol. 1 by Stanley Clarke. In 2008, Satriani added guitar parts to YouTube Live by Funtwo, Jason Becker's Collection, as well as Clean by Dave Martone. In 2010, he worked on Bingo! by the Steve Miller Band and What Lies Beneath by Tarja, followed in 2013 by Steve Hunter's The Manhattan Blues Project.
In 2017, Satriani contributed to the tracks "The Healer", "North Bound", "Horsepower", and "Hometown" on the Marco Minnemann album Borrego.

In 2019, he released the album Squares, a collection of tracks recorded by the band Squares, which he formed with his brother-in-law Neil Sheehan in the late 1970s.

Satriani has taken part in all releases by the supergroup Chickenfoot. Their debut studio album, Chickenfoot, sold 560,000 copies in the United States and more than 40,000 in Canada, where the record was also certified Gold. The band's second studio album, Chickenfoot III, sold 35,000 copies in the United States.

In 2020, Satriani played a guitar solo on the track "Get Out! Now!" from Dutch metal opera project Ayreon's tenth album, Transitus.  Also in 2020, Satriani was featured on the Cory Wong song "Massive" from Wong's release The Striped Album.

In 2021, Satriani was featured on two Kitt Wakeley singles, "Conflicted" and "Forgive Me".  Both are from Wakeley's album Symphony of Sinners & Saints.

G3 projects

Chickenfoot

Studio albums

Live albums

Compilations

Singles

Notes

References

 
 
Rock music discographies
Heavy metal discographies
Discographies of American artists